The 2021–22 National League season was the 84th season of Swiss professional ice hockey and the fifth season as the National League (NL).

EV Zug defended their title after beating ZSC Lions in the finals 4–3.

13 teams participated in the season as HC Ajoie was promoted to the National League after winning 2020–21 Swiss League.

Teams

Regular season

Standings

Statistics

Scoring leaders

The following shows the top ten players who led the league in points, at the conclusion of the regular season. If two or more skaters are tied (i.e. same number of points, goals and played games), all of the tied skaters are shown.

Leading goaltenders
The following shows the top ten goaltenders who led the league in goals against average, provided that they have played at least 40% of their team's minutes, at the conclusion of the regular season.

Playoffs

Bracket

Pre-Playoffs

(7) Lausanne HC vs. (10) HC Ambrì-Piotta

(8) Genève-Servette HC vs. (9) HC Lugano

Quarter-finals

(1) EV Zug vs. (9) HC Lugano

(2) HC Fribourg-Gottéron vs. (7) Lausanne HC

(3) ZSC Lions vs. (6) EHC Biel

(4) SC Rapperswil-Jona Lakers vs. (5) HC Davos

Semi-finals

(1) EV Zug vs. (5) HC Davos

(2) HC Fribourg-Gottéron vs. (3) ZSC Lions

Finals

References

External links
 
 
NL on eurohockey.com
NL on eliteprospects.com

1
Swiss
National League (ice hockey) seasons